Khmelyovka is a rural locality (a selo) in Ivanchugsky Selsoviet, Kamyzyaksky District, Astrakhan Oblast, Russia. The population was 467 as of 2010. There are 7 streets.

Geography 
Khmelyovka is located 25 km west of Kamyzyak (the district's administrative centre) by road. Ivanchug is the nearest rural locality.

References 

Rural localities in Kamyzyaksky District